Castle Point is a constituency in Essex represented in the House of Commons of the UK Parliament since 2010 by Rebecca Harris, a Conservative.

History
This seat was created for the 1983 general election from the former seat of South East Essex. It comprised the District of Castle Point which was formed from the former Urban Districts of Canvey Island and Benfleet and includes Canvey Island, Hadleigh, South Benfleet, and Thundersley.

In all but one election, it has been won by a Conservative candidate, passing to Labour once, in the 1997 election. The former MP defeated in 1997, Bob Spink, regained the seat in 2001. He was re-elected in 2005 but subsequently resigned from the Conservative Party on 22 April 2008. Spink briefly joined UKIP, but resigned the whip shortly afterwards and sat as an Independent MP. In the 2010 election, Spink lost in Castle Point to the Conservative candidate, Rebecca Harris.

After the 2017 election Castle Point has the largest Conservative majority of any constituency to have elected a Labour MP in the 1997–2010 government, at 42.2%.

Boundaries 

Since its creation, the Castle Point constituency has been contiguous with the boundaries of the district council of the same name. The seat is one of only a very few that were unchanged by the boundary reviews which came into effect in 1997 and 2010, having seen population growth in line with the average seat (which is slightly larger), including development in the designated development plans of the Thames Gateway.

Constituency profile 
The seat is coterminous with the Castle Point local authority, taking its name from Hadleigh Castle and Canvey Point, and covering the Canvey Island at the seaside end of the Thames Estuary plus a segment of the adjoining mainland.

In 2001, Castle Point was characterised by skilled manual workers, commuters and the self-employed. Levels of home and car ownership in Hadleigh and Canvey were very high while social deprivation was relatively low.

Of all the constituencies of the UK, it has one of the lowest levels of graduates.

Members of Parliament

Elections

Elections in the 2010s

This was the largest Conservative vote share at the 2019 general election.

Elections in the 2000s

Elections in the 1990s

Elections in the 1980s

See also 
 List of parliamentary constituencies in Essex

Notes

References

External links 
nomis Constituency Profile for Castle Point — presenting data from the ONS annual population survey and other official statistics.

Parliamentary constituencies in Essex
Constituencies of the Parliament of the United Kingdom established in 1983